Senator Norman may refer to:

H. Wayne Norman Jr. (1955–2018), Maryland State Senate
Jim Norman (politician) (born 1953), Florida State Senate
Linda Norman (politician) (fl. 2010s), Maryland State Senate